Kei Lun Wai is a village in Tuen Mun District, Hong Kong.

Administration
Kei Lun Wai is a recognized village under the New Territories Small House Policy. It is one of the 36 villages represented within the Tuen Mun Rural Committee. For electoral purposes, Kei Lun Wai is part of the Po Tin constituency.

History
Archaeological deposits in Siu Hang Tsuen and Kei Lun Wai were discovered in 1997 during a survey carried out by a team from Zhongshan University. The findings indicated occupation of the area from the Song, Ming and Qing periods.

Education
Kei Lun Wai is in Primary One Admission (POA) School Net 70. Within the school net are multiple aided schools (operated independently but funded with government money) and the following government schools: Tuen Mun Government Primary School (屯門官立小學).

See also
 Kei Lun stop

References

External links

 Delineation of area of existing village Kei Lun Wai (Tuen Mun) for election of resident representative (2019 to 2022)
 Antiquities Advisory Board. Historic Building Appraisal. Nos. 15-17, Row 4, Kei Lun Wai Pictures

Villages in Tuen Mun District, Hong Kong